George Wardle (24 September 1919 – November 1991) was an English footballer who scored 27 goals from 227 appearances in the Football League playing for Middlesbrough, Exeter City, Cardiff City, Queens Park Rangers and Darlington either side of the Second World War. He played as a wing half or outside forward. He guested for clubs including Chelsea and Lincoln City during the war.

Wardle then went into coaching, first with Crook Town and then with Middlesbrough's youth teams.

References

1919 births
1991 deaths
People from County Durham (before 1974)
English footballers
Association football wing halves
Association football wingers
Middlesbrough F.C. players
Exeter City F.C. players
Cardiff City F.C. players
Queens Park Rangers F.C. players
Darlington F.C. players
Crook Town A.F.C. players
English Football League players
Chelsea F.C. wartime guest players
Lincoln City F.C. wartime guest players
Middlesbrough F.C. non-playing staff
Footballers from Tyne and Wear